Argatroban is an anticoagulant that is a small molecule direct thrombin inhibitor.  In 2000, argatroban was licensed by the Food and Drug Administration (FDA) for prophylaxis or treatment of thrombosis in patients with heparin-induced thrombocytopenia (HIT).  In 2002, it was approved for use during percutaneous coronary interventions in patients who have HIT or are at risk for developing it. In 2012, it was approved by the MHRA in the UK for anticoagulation in patients with heparin-induced thrombocytopenia Type II (HIT) who require parenteral antithrombotic therapy.

Argatroban is given intravenously and drug plasma concentrations reach steady state in 1–3 hours. Argatroban is metabolized in the liver and has a half-life of about 50 minutes.  It is monitored by PTT.  Because of its hepatic metabolism, it may be used in patients with renal dysfunction.  (This is in contrast to lepirudin, a direct thrombin inhibitor that is primarily renally cleared).

Transitioning to warfarin in individuals with heparin-induced thrombocytopenia
Argatroban is used as an anticoagulant in individuals with thrombosis and heparin-induced thrombocytopenia.  Often these individuals require long-term anticoagulation.  If warfarin is chosen as the long-term anticoagulant, this poses particular challenges due to the falsely elevated prothrombin time and INR caused by argatroban.  The combination of argatroban and warfarin may raise the INR to greater than 5.0 without a significant increased risk of bleeding complications. One solution to this problem is to measure the chromogenic factor X level. A level < 40-45% typically indicates that the INR will be therapeutic (2-3) when the argatroban is discontinued.

References

External links 
 

Direct thrombin inhibitors
Guanidines
Sulfonamides